Fair comment is a legal term for a common law defense in defamation cases (libel or slander). It is referred to as honest comment in some countries.

United States
In the United States, the traditional privilege of "fair comment" is seen as a protection for robust, even outrageous published or spoken opinions about public officials and public figures. Fair comment is defined as a "common law defense [that] guarantees the freedom of the press to express statements on matters of public interest, as long as the statements are not made with ill will, spite, or with the intent to harm the plaintiff".

The defense of "fair comment" in the U.S. since 1964 has largely been replaced by the ruling in New York Times Co. v. Sullivan, 376 U.S. 254 (1964). This case relied on the issue of actual malice, which involves the defendant making a statement known at the time to be false, or which was made with a "reckless disregard" of whether the statement was true or false. If "actual malice" cannot be shown, the defense of "fair comment" is then superseded by the broader protection of the failure by the plaintiff to show "actual malice".

Each state writes its own laws of defamation, and the laws and previously decided precedents in each state vary. In many states, (including Alabama where the case of Times v. Sullivan originated), the "fair comment" defense requires that the "privilege of 'fair comment' for expressions of opinion depends on the truth of the facts upon which the comment is based" according to U.S Supreme Court Justice Brennan who wrote the ruling in Times v. Sullivan.

It is still technically possible to rely on the common law defense of "fair comment" without referring to the "actual malice" standard set by the Supreme Court of the United States but that would only be a likely course of action when the defendant is absolutely sure that the facts upon which the opinion of the defendant was based were true, or that any falsehoods are not defamatory. If those facts are not absolutely true (and the actual malice standard is not taken into account) then the defendant could be sued by the plaintiff for damages, although the plaintiff would need to establish to the satisfaction of a jury that the statements were defamatory, and that the defendant published or made them.

"Actual malice" removes the requirement of being faultless in the reporting of the facts by the defendant. (Under the law prior to this decision any false statement could, if found to be defamatory, be grounds for damages.) Instead it raises the question of whether factual errors were made in good faith. "Actual malice" means then that the defendant intentionally made false statements of alleged facts, or recklessly failed to verify alleged facts when any reasonable person would have checked. If it is held that the defendant made intentionally false statements of fact, that will form a powerful argument that any statements of opinion based upon those facts were made with malice. If the plaintiff can prove malice on the part of the defendant the common law defense of "fair comment" is defeated.

The "actual malice" standard only applies when the statement is about a "public official", or a "public figure", or in some cases about a "matter of public interest". When it does apply it offers so much more protection to the defendant that it would be very rare for the defendant to assert "fair comment" instead. When the allegedly defamatory statement is about a purely private person, who is not a "public figure" in any way, the defendant may need to resort to the defense of "fair comment" instead.
Also, the "actual malice" standard is specifically part of United States law, derived from the U.S. Constitution. The defense of "fair comment" is a part of the older common law, and so might apply in non-U.S. jurisdictions which share the common-law tradition, such as the United Kingdom and the British Commonwealth.

Canada

In Canada, for something to constitute fair comment, the comment must be on a matter of public interest (excluding gossip), based on known and provable facts, must be an opinion that any person is capable of holding based on those facts, and with no actual malice underlying it. The cardinal test of whether a statement is fair comment is whether it is recognizable as an opinion rather than a statement of fact, and whether it could be drawn from the known facts. There was formerly a rule stating that the opinion must be honestly held by the publisher (See Chernesky v. Armadale Publications Ltd. [1978] 6 W.W.R. 618 (S.C.C.)) but this rule was changed to one requiring that the opinion is capable of being held by anyone. (See Rafe Mair v. Kari Simpson [2008] 2 S.C.R. 420)

United Kingdom

Fletcher-Moulton LJ said in Hunt v Star Newspaper [1908] 2 KB 309, Tab 3, at 319-320, CA:

In Branson v Bower [2002] QB 737, at p 748, para 29, Eady J said:

Whether the comment is fair, Diplock J (as Lord Diplock then was) said in a summing up to jury in Silkin v. Beaverbrook Newspapers Ltd. and Another [1958] 1 WLR 743, Tab 5, at 749:

In relation to malice in the context of fair comment (which is different from the malice in the context of qualified privilege), Lord Nicholls of Birkenhead NPJ said in Albert Cheng v Tse Wai Chun (2000) 3 HKCFAR 339 at p 360I to 361D:

The common law defence of fair comment in an action for defamation was abolished in England and Wales by the Defamation Act 2013, replaced with the statutory defence of honest opinion.

References

External links
dictionary law.com
Media Libel University of Houston
[http://caselaw.lp.findlaw.com/scripts/getcase.pl?court=US&vol=376&invol=254 Opinion: "New York Times Co. v. Sullivan]

Further reading
Crawford, Michael G. The Journalist's Legal Guide'', Carswell, 2002

Legal terminology
Defamation